Scott Alexander Scheffler (born June 21, 1996) is an American professional golfer who plays on the PGA Tour. He is the current world number one, first reaching the position in the Official World Golf Ranking in March 2022 and has held the ranking for a cumulative 32 weeks. He has won one major championship, the 2022 Masters Tournament. He also won the 2023 Players Championship.

Early life
Scheffler was born in Ridgewood, New Jersey on June 21, 1996. His father, Scott, grew up in Englewood Cliffs, New Jersey, and attended St. Cecilia High School in Englewood. His mother, Diane, grew up in Park Ridge, New Jersey. Scheffler is the only boy among four siblings. His sisters are named Callie, Molly and Sara. The family lived in Montvale, New Jersey, until Scheffler was aged six, when they moved to Dallas, Texas, in the wake of the September 11 attacks. Scheffler's father was a stay-at-home dad, while his mother worked as a chief operating officer at the law firm Thompson & Knight.

Scheffler's interest in golf began at age three, when his parents gave him a set of plastic clubs and ball. After the move to Dallas, he received tutelage at the Royal Oaks Golf Club under instructor Randy Smith, who coached Justin Leonard to a victory at The Open Championship in 1997. Scheffler had prolific success at the youth level, and won 75 times on the PGA junior circuit, competing against the likes of fellow Dallas-area native Will Zalatoris.

The rapid growth caused back injuries for Scheffler, particularly during his sophomore year. He played golf and basketball at Highland Park High School in the Dallas suburb of University Park. At Highland Park, Scheffler won individual state titles three years in a row (2012 to 2014), matching a record set by fellow Texan Jordan Spieth. He also had success in AJGA events, won the 2013 U.S. Junior Amateur, and was the top-ranked junior golfer in the country in 2014. Scheffler made his PGA Tour debut in May 2014, as a 17-year-old amateur at the HP Byron Nelson Championship. With his sister Callie caddying for him, he made the cut. He recorded a hole-in-one in the third round and ultimately finished at 4-under-par, in a tie for 22nd place. He was ineligible for the $60,000 payout due to his amateur status.

Scheffler was then recruited to play collegiate golf at the University of Texas from 2014 to 2018, where he helped the team win three Big 12 championships and was named "Phil Mickelson Freshman of the Year" in 2015. He graduated in 2018 with a bachelor's degree in finance. He was also part of the U.S. team that won the 2017 Walker Cup.

In 2016, Scheffler qualified for his first U.S. Open. He opened with a first-round 69, but would shoot a second-round 78 to miss the cut by one stroke. The following year, Scheffler again qualified for the U.S. Open, after surviving a 4-for-3 playoff to earn a spot in the field.  He and Cameron Champ were the only two amateurs to make the cut at the 2017 U.S. Open. Scheffler finished as low amateur at 1-under-par, one stroke ahead of Champ.

Professional career

Korn Ferry Tour Player of the Year 
Scheffler earned his 2019 Web.com Tour card through qualifying school.

On May 26, 2019, Scheffler fired a bogey-free, 9-under 63 — playing the back nine in 30 — to force a playoff with 54-hole leader Marcelo Rozo in the Evans Scholars Invitational. He then birdied the second extra hole for his first Web.com Tour victory. On August 18, 2019, Scheffler won the Nationwide Children's Hospital Championship in Columbus, Ohio. Scheffler shot 4-under 67 in the final round  at Ohio State University's Scarlet Course for a two-shot victory. He totaled a 12-under 272 for the week and finished two shots ahead of Brendon Todd, Beau Hossler and Ben Taylor. This event was part of the Korn Ferry Tour Finals (the Web.com Tour was renamed the Korn Ferry Tour in mid-season). Scheffler led both the Finals points list and the overall points list to earn a fully exempt PGA Tour card for the 2020 season. He was later named Korn Ferry Tour Player of the Year.

PGA Tour Rookie of the Year
In August 2020, Scheffler finished tied for fourth at the 2020 PGA Championship. He won $528,000 in prize money in the tournament.

On August 21, 2020, Scheffler shot a 12-under 59 at The Northern Trust. His round was the joint second-lowest in PGA Tour history and just the 12th sub-60 round in PGA Tour history.

He was named the PGA Tour Rookie of the Year for the 2019-20 season.

In September 2021, Scheffler played on the U.S. team in the 2021 Ryder Cup at Whistling Straits in Kohler, Wisconsin. The U.S. team won 19–9 and Scheffler went 2–0–1 including a win in his Sunday singles match against world number one Jon Rahm.

World number one, Masters champion 
On February 13, 2022, Scheffler won the WM Phoenix Open on the third hole of a sudden-death playoff against Patrick Cantlay. Three weeks later, Scheffler won his second career PGA Tour title at the Arnold Palmer Invitational in Orlando, Florida. He won by one stroke over Viktor Hovland, Billy Horschel and Tyrrell Hatton. Three weeks after that, Scheffler won the WGC-Dell Technologies Match Play in Austin, Texas, defeating Kevin Kisner in the final match. With this win, Scheffler moved to world number one in the Official World Golf Ranking. 

On April 10, 2022, Scheffler won the Masters Tournament, defeating Rory McIlroy by three strokes. Scheffler became the fifth golfer to enter the Masters Tournament ranked No. 1 in the world and go on to win the Masters, joining Ian Woosnam (1991), Fred Couples (1992), Tiger Woods (2001, 2002) and Dustin Johnson (2020). The victory was his fourth for the 2022 PGA Tour season, making him the first golfer since Arnold Palmer in 1960, and only the second ever, to win as many events including the Masters in that span of time to begin a season. It was his fourth win in his last 6 starts.

At the next major, the 2022 PGA Championship, he missed the cut. On May 29, 2022, Scheffler lost the Charles Schwab Challenge in a playoff to Sam Burns after Burns made a 38-foot birdie putt. At the U.S. Open, he finished T-2, one stroke behind from the winner Matt Fitzpatrick.

Entering the 2022 Tour Championship as the leader in the FedEx Cup standings, Scheffler started the tournament in first place with a 2-stroke lead in the starting strokes format. He extended his lead to 6 strokes after 54 holes, but shot a 3-over-par 73 in the final round to lose the tournament by one stroke to Rory McIlroy. This tied Scheffler for the PGA Tour record of largest 54-hole lead blown.

In September 2022, Scheffler was named 2022 PGA Tour Player of the Year, earning the Jack Nicklaus Award for the first time.

Scheffler qualified for the U.S. team at the 2022 Presidents Cup; he lost three of the four matches he played, tying the other.

In February 2023, Scheffler successfully defended his title at the WM Phoenix Open. He shot a final round 6-under 65 to beat Nick Taylor by two strokes. With the win, Scheffler returned to number one in the Official World Golf Ranking. 

In March 2023, Scheffler won The Players Championship by five stokes and regained the number one ranking in the Official World Golf Ranking for the second time in the year. It was the largest margin of victory in The Players Championship since Stephen Ames won by six in 2006. Scheffler joined Tiger Woods and Jack Nicklaus as the only players to win the Masters Tournament and The Players Championship in a 12-month span.

Personal life
Scheffler is married to Meredith Scheffler (née Scudder). They met each other in high school, and married in 2020. 

Scheffler is a Christian. He attends Bible study with his caddie Ted Scott, who caddied for Bubba Watson for 15 years. When requesting Scott to be his caddie, Scheffler said "I really want to work with a Christian. That's how I try to live my life." Scheffler and his close friend Sam Burns co-host an annual retreat with members of the College Golf Fellowship, a faith-based ministry.

Scheffler appears in the sports documentary series Full Swing, which premiered on Netflix on February 15, 2023.

Amateur wins
2011 Legends Junior Match Play Championship
2013 U.S. Junior Amateur
2014 Junior Invitational
2015 Annual Western Intercollegiate, Big 12 Championship

Source:

Professional wins (8)

PGA Tour wins (6)

PGA Tour playoff record (1–1)

Korn Ferry Tour wins (2)

Korn Ferry Tour playoff record (1–1)

Major championships

Wins (1)

Results timeline
Results not in chronological order in 2020.

LA = Low amateur
CUT = missed the half-way cut
"T" = tied
NT = No tournament due to COVID-19 pandemic

Summary

Most consecutive cuts made – 7 (2020 PGA – 2022 Masters)
Longest streak of top-10s – 4 (2021 PGA – 2022 Masters)

The Players Championship

Wins (1)

Results timeline

CUT = missed the halfway cut
"T" indicates a tie for a place

World Golf Championships

Wins (1)

Results timeline

1Cancelled due to COVID-19 pandemic

NT = No tournament
"T" = tied
Note that the Championship and Invitational were discontinued from 2022.

U.S. national team appearances
Amateur
Junior Ryder Cup: 2012 (winners)
Spirit International: 2013 (winners)
Eisenhower Trophy: 2016
Walker Cup: 2017 (winners)

Professional
Ryder Cup: 2021 (winners)
Presidents Cup: 2022 (winners)

See also
2019 Korn Ferry Tour Finals graduates
Lowest rounds of golf

References

External links

American male golfers
Texas Longhorns men's golfers
PGA Tour golfers
Winners of men's major golf championships
Korn Ferry Tour graduates
Golfers from Dallas
People from Ridgewood, New Jersey
People from Montvale, New Jersey
1996 births
Living people